Technikum is an institute of vocational education in some parts of Europe.

It is a mass-education institution of "special middle education" category 1 step higher than PTU, but aimed to train low and middle level (depending on profile) industrial managers, foremen, coordinators, technical supervisors etc. or specializing in occupations that require skills more advanced than purely manual labor, especially in high-tech occupations (such as electronics). After graduation from a technikum/college, a student may apply to an institution of higher learning (i.e. university) as a freshman.

Poland
A student finishing the 8th year of compulsory education has to choose between three types of schools:
 Liceum ogólnokształcące (high school, 4 years), designed mainly for those who want to pass matura and begin higher studies,
 Branżowa szkoła I stopnia (vocational school, 3 years), designed for those who want to start working immediately after finishing their compulsory education
 Technikum (professional technical school, 5 years), after which students have both qualifications to start working and possibility to pass matura and begin studies.
    
People who have completed a technikum and passed the final exams (organized by an external, state unit - Centralna Komisja Egzaminacyjna - Central Examination Board) in their profession obtain a title consisting of the word technik and the profession they have learnt (for example technik elektryk - electrical industry technician), where the word technician (technik) cannot be used by those who finished three-year vocational school. Their title contains only the name of profession, for example elektryk (electrician).

Examples (in alphabetical order): 
Technikum Budowlane: Vocational Technical High School for Construction 
Technikum Ceramiczne: Vocational Technical High School for Ceramics
Technikum Chemiczne: Vocational Technical High School for Chemistry
Technikum Drogowe Zespołu Szkół Budowlanych: Vocational Technical High School for Road Construction
Technikum Drzewne: Vocational Technical High School for Woodworking
Technikum Elektryczne: Vocational Technical High School for Electrical Science
Technikum Energetyczne: Vocational Technical High School for Energetic Science
Technikum Usług Fryzjerskich: Vocational Technical High School for Hairdressing
Technikum Gastronomiczne: Secondary Technical School of Catering (Note: not a cooking school, per se)
Technikum Handlowe: Vocational Trade High School for Retail
Technikum Hodowlane: Vocational Technical High School for Agricultural Studies
Technikum Hotelarskie: Vocational Technical High School for Hotel Administration
Technikum Informatyczne: Vocational Technical High School for Computer Science
Technikum Łączności: Vocational Technical High School for Telecommunications
Technikum Mechaniczne: Vocational Technical High School for Mechanical Studies
Technikum Obsługi Turystycznej: Vocational School for Tourism and tourism-related enterprise

Education in Poland
School types